The Cathedral of Saint Paul — informally known as Saint Paul's Cathedral — is the mother church of the Roman Catholic Diocese of Birmingham in Alabama in Birmingham, Alabama. Designed by Chicago architect Adolphus Druiding, the Victorian Gothic-style brick building was completed as a parish church in 1893. The parish it serves was established in 1872 and the cornerstone bears both dates. It was elevated to cathedral status with the creation of the Diocese of Birmingham in 1969.

During its days as a parish, its most famous pastor was Father James Coyle. There is the aspiration of relocating his remains from Elmwood Cemetery to the cathedral as the cause for his beatification as a martyr advances.

The contractor that had to be talked into moving to Birmingham to build the project was Lawrence Scully.  Just prior to its completion, Lawrence Scully was killed when his horse-drawn carriage was spooked by a passing motor vehicle that honked its horn.  The horse reared and flipped the carriage over, killing Lawrence Scully.  Lawrence Scully also built one of Birmingham's first public schools, the Powell School.

Two buildings, the church and associated school, were listed on the National Register of Historic Places as St. Paul's Catholic Church in 1982.

The stained-glass windows in the cathedral's aisles are the work of G. C. Riordan & Company of Cincinnati. They were in place when the church was first used. The large window of St. Paul over the entrance was installed in 1972, replacing an older window that had been damaged in a storm.

Pastors and Rectors of St. Paul's 
1. Father John J. Browne, 1880-1886

2. Father Patrick A. O‘Reilly, 1888-1904

3. Father James E. Coyle, 1904-1921

4. Father William A. Kerrigan, 1922-1935

5. Father Eugene L. Sands, 1936-1949

6. Father Francis J. Foley, 1951-1953

7. Father Francis J. McCormack, 1953-1967

8. Father George W. Keyes, 1967-1971

9. Father John M. Horgan, 1971-1979

10. Father J. Peter Sheehan, 1979-1991

11. Father Patrick P. Cullen, 1991-2001

12. Father Richard Donohoe, 2001-2009

13. Father Kevin Bazzel, 2009-2016

14. Father Bryan Jerabek, 2016-present

See also
List of Catholic cathedrals in the United States
List of cathedrals in the United States
St Paul's Church, Birmingham (UK)

References

External links

 Official Cathedral Site
 Roman Catholic Diocese of Birmingham Official Site
 The Cathedral of Saint Paul Webpage

Churches in Birmingham, Alabama
Gothic Revival church buildings in Alabama
National Register of Historic Places in Birmingham, Alabama
Churches on the National Register of Historic Places in Alabama
Roman Catholic cathedrals in Alabama
Roman Catholic churches completed in 1893
Roman Catholic churches in Alabama
Roman Catholic Diocese of Birmingham in Alabama
Towers in Alabama
19th-century Roman Catholic church buildings in the United States